Simon Nicholls (born 1977 in London) is a radio and TV comedy producer at the BBC.

Education

He was educated at St Edward's School, Oxford and the University of East Anglia (LLB, 1999).

Career
When Ed Reardon approached Nicholls about an idea for a new radio show, "he was delighted. Within two months they had a series commissioned ..." Ed Reardon’s Week, which became a hit radio show for four seasons.

In reviewing BBC Radio 4 on Wednesdays, The Telegraph stated, "It is so funny you can hear each episode five times (thanks to the marvellous iPlayer) and still find new things to laugh at (thanks to producer Simon Nicholls)."

Nicholls has worked with Armando Iannucci at the BBC, and in 2008 he produced the sitcom Lab Rats, written by Chris Addison and Carl Cooper, for BBC2. In 2009, BBC2 aired the TV version of Genius, produced by Nicholls.

Nicholls currently works at NBC Universal where he recently produced the panel show pilot Never Mind the Woodcocks for Radio 4.

References

External links
 Simon Nicholls' personal MySpace page

1977 births
Living people
People educated at St Edward's School, Oxford
Alumni of the University of East Anglia
BBC people
British television producers
Television people from London